Tragedian refers to:

A term for Greek playwrights who wrote tragedies. See Greek Tragedy.
The name of the roving acting company in Tom Stoppard's Rosencrantz and Guildenstern are Dead.